The Putrajaya Monorail is an incomplete monorail system in Putrajaya, Malaysia.  Construction has been stalled since 2004, but in 2020, it was stated that the system would be completed by 2025.

Putrajaya was originally planned to include a light rail system, but plans were changed, and a monorail plan was selected instead, after the construction of tunnels for aforementioned system began.
It called for two sublines; Line 1, which is a  monorail route with 17 stations and Line 2, which is a  monorail route with 6 stations. In 2019, the government proposed a new light rapid transit (LRT) system may be built to revive the incomplete monorail project.

The monorail will include the Monorail Suspension Bridge, currently incomplete, and the Putra Bridge.

The monorail line would allow transfers to the existing KLIA Transit, connecting to Kuala Lumpur and Kuala Lumpur International Airport, and the now opened MRT Putrajaya line at   Putrajaya Sentral station. The project originally cost RM400 million.

Project Status

In 2016, the MMC Corporation Berhad (MMC) submitted a proposal to the Economic Council (EC) to revive the stalled monorail project. The Land Public Transport Commission (SPAD) was due to conduct a feasibility study for monorail and tram services for both Putrajaya and Cyberjaya.

In October 2020, the government announced it had opened a request for proposals process to complete the project, within three months.  As of 2021, the RFP has not yet opened.

Putrajaya Tram Proposal
Federal Territories Minister, Datuk Seri Tengku Adnan Tengku Mansor, had hoped to get tram infrastructure construction going within three years.
Now under the jurisdiction of the Economic Council, the minister saw the development of the tram system as an alternative solution to the abandoned monorail projects and recommended it be built due to cost considerations.

SPAD had hoped to open up tenders for the tram system between Putrajaya and Bangi in 2018 after getting the green light from EC. This move was announced by SPAD during their annual review of public transportation for 2017. The tram system was selected due to its relatively cheaper price of construction and operation compared to conventional rail systems.

The tram system is expected to be integrated with the existing and future rail lines between Putrajaya and Bangi and will also cover the distance between Cyberjaya and Kajang. The MRT Kajang Line only reaches Kajang but MRT Putrajaya Line will reach   Putrajaya Sentral station which is currently in operation. The future HSR station located at Kampung Abu Bakar Baginda will be one of the expected stops along the planned tram route.

The stretch between Putrajaya and Bangi has been selected as the first phase to be constructed due to their wide roads, allowing the tram system to share the traffic.

<noinclude>

See also
Monorails in Malaysia

References

External links
Structurae: Putrajaya Monorail
Construction Gallery from monorails.org

Transport in Putrajaya
Monorails in Malaysia
Proposed rail infrastructure in Malaysia